Arthur Bischoff (12 May 1901 – 25 August 1976) was a Swiss diver. He competed at the 1924 Summer Olympics and the 1928 Summer Olympics.

References

External links
 

1901 births
1976 deaths
Swiss male divers
Olympic divers of Switzerland
Divers at the 1924 Summer Olympics
Divers at the 1928 Summer Olympics
Place of birth missing
20th-century Swiss people